The Blue Army Tour was a concert tour by American hard rock band Aerosmith. The tour sent the band to 17 locations across North America from June to August 2015, followed by a one-off performance in Moscow on September 5. The band started the tour in Glendale, Arizona on June 13, 2015. The band performed at a mix of large venues, small venues, and festivals.  The tour saw the band perform in several locations they had never previously performed in, as well as locations the band had not performed in several years. The band played some lesser-known deep cuts on the tour.

Tour dates

Personnel
Aerosmith
Steven Tyler - lead vocals, harmonica, percussion
Joe Perry - guitar, backing vocals, lap pedal steel, talkbox, lead vocals on "Stop Messin' Around"
Brad Whitford - guitar
Tom Hamilton - bass
Joey Kramer - drums, percussion
Additional musicians
Buck Johnson - keyboards, backing vocals

References

2015 concert tours
Aerosmith concert tours